This Is Not Paradise is a 2000 Italian neo-noir film written and directed by Gianluca Maria Tavarelli and starring Fabrizio Gifuni. It is loosely based on actual events happened in Turin in 1996.

It was nominated for two Silver Ribbons, for best screenplay and best original story.

Plot 

Renato and his best friend Walter live two unsatisfied lives. The two decide that the only way they can ever change for the better is by robbing a postal van and escape to Costa Rica. Their plan would be perfect were it not for an especially determined police commissioner called Lucidi. Lucidi retraces Renato and Walter's steps and reconstructs Renato's miserable life bit by bit.

Cast 

Fabrizio Gifuni as Renato Sapienza
Valerio Binasco as Wallter Taranto
Antonio Catania as Commissioner Lucidi
 Erika Bernardi as Claudia
 Riccardo Zinna as Inspector Esposito
Ugo Conti as Enzo Pace
Adriano Pappalardo as Michele Manzo
 Riccardo Montanaro as Donato Catena
Franco Neri 	 as Vito Vitale

See also  
 List of Italian films of 2000

References

External links

2000 crime drama films
2000 films
Italian crime drama films
Italian neo-noir films
Crime films based on actual events
2000s Italian films